Miss Bhutan is a national beauty pageant based in Bhutan. Since 2022, the winner will compete at Miss Universe pageant.

The first winner of Miss Bhutan, Tsokye Tsomo Karchung, participated in Miss Earth 2008 beauty pageant, an annual international beauty contest promoting environmental awareness.

History
Miss Bhutan is organized and produced by MPC Bhutan Entertainment, a film production company based in Thimphu, the capital city of Bhutan. On October 10, 2008, MPC Bhutan entertainment organized Miss Bhutan pageant and launched it first Miss Bhutan beauty pageant. The Founding President of Miss Bhutan Pageant is Karma Tshering.

The selection of the Miss Bhutan finalists and eventually the winner of the pageant is based on the decision of a panel of judges on the performance and physical attributes of the candidates and not by public voting system. The winner of Miss Bhutan receives a cash prize of Nu 100,000. The Miss Bhutan crown, designed in Bhutan, is worth another Nu 100,000.

In 2008, the winner represented the country at Miss Earth beauty pageant. Although there was no swimsuit round in the actual Miss Bhutan contest, the winner is trained in an enclosed area for the swimsuit competition in preparation for the international Miss Earth competition. 77 contestants from all across Bhutan registered for the Miss Bhutan 2008, but only 20 contestants were short listed in the main event after the preliminary round.

On November 9, 2008, Miss Bhutan 2008 Tsoki Tsomo Karchung participated in the 8th edition of Miss Earth beauty pageant, which was held at the Clark Expo Amphitheater in Angeles, Pampanga, Philippines. Eighty-five women arrived from October 19, 2008 in the Philippines.

Titleholders

Representatives to international beauty pageants

Miss Bhutan Universe

Past titleholders under Miss Bhutan org.

Miss Bhutan Earth

Notes

Miss Bhutan 2008
The grand finale of Miss Bhutan 2008 was held on 10 October 2008 in the YDF Auditorium, the nations's biggest auditorium hall.

The pageant was judged by five famous personalities and two international judges, Kelly Dorji, actor/model popular in Bollywood Film Industry and Charm Osathanond, Miss Thailand 2006.

Miss Tshoki Tshomo Karchung, 24, was crowned as the first ever Miss Bhutan 2008. She also took the title of Miss Photogenic and Miss Talent. Shelkar Choden took the 1st runners up prize and Tshering Pem took the 2nd runner up prize.

Miss Bhutan represented Bhutan in Miss Earth 2008, Miss Young International in Taiwan, and Miss Safari 2008 in Kenya.

The Bhutan Information Communication and Media Authority (BICMA), Bhutan's media regulatory body did not allow the contest to use the Gross National Happiness tag, as they believed its use didn't correspond with beauty contests.

Contestants

Results

See also
Miss Earth
Miss Earth 2008

References

Bhutan
Beauty pageants in Bhutan
2008 establishments in Bhutan
Bhutanese awards